The 2022 Georgia gubernatorial election took place on November 8, 2022 to elect the governor of Georgia. Incumbent Republican governor Brian Kemp won re-election to a second term, defeating Democratic nominee Stacey Abrams in a rematch. Abrams conceded on election night. The primary occurred on May 24, 2022. Kemp was sworn in for a second term on January 12, 2023.

Kemp was endorsed by former Vice President Mike Pence. He faced a primary challenge from former U.S. Senator David Perdue, who was endorsed by former President Donald Trump after Kemp refused to overturn the results of the 2020 presidential election in Georgia.

Stacey Abrams, the former Minority Leader of the Georgia House of Representatives and founder of Fair Fight Action who was narrowly defeated by Kemp in the 2018 gubernatorial election, was once again the Democratic nominee for the governorship. This was Georgia's first gubernatorial rematch since 1950.

Libertarian Shane T. Hazel, the Libertarian nominee for U.S. Senate in 2020, also declared he would run.  This race was one of six Republican-held governorships up for election in 2022 in a state carried by Joe Biden in the 2020 presidential election.

Kemp won his first term by a narrow 55,000-vote margin (1.4%) in 2018, which was Georgia's closest gubernatorial election since 1966. In 2022, however, he won by nearly 300,000 votes (7.5%) - the largest raw vote victory for a Georgia governor since 2006. The race was seen as a potential benefit to Herschel Walker, who ran in the concurrent Senate race, as it was speculated Kemp's strong performance could help Walker avoid a runoff. He underperformed compared to Kemp, however, and lost to incumbent Democratic Senator Raphael Warnock in the December 6 runoff election.

Republican primary
Incumbent Governor Brian Kemp faced criticism from former President Donald Trump for his refusal to overturn the results of the 2020 United States presidential election. Kemp was booed at the Georgia Republican Convention in June 2021, and in December former Senator David Perdue announced a primary challenge to Kemp and was promptly endorsed by Trump. Initial polling showed a competitive race, however, Kemp significantly outraised his opponent and signed conservative legislation such as permitless carry of firearms and a temporary suspension of the gas tax that shored up his position among voters, and on election day, he won by over 50 points, a margin far larger than predicted.

Candidates

Nominee
Brian Kemp, incumbent governor (2019–present)

Eliminated in primary
Catherine Davis, HR Professional
David Perdue, former U.S. Senator from Georgia (2015–2021)
Kandiss Taylor, educator and candidate for U.S. Senate in 2020
Tom Williams, civil service retiree

Withdrawn 
Vernon Jones, former state representative (1993–2001, 2017–2021, Democratic until 2020) and CEO of DeKalb County (2001–2009) (endorsed Perdue) (ran for U.S. House in GA-10)

Declined 
Herschel Walker, former American football player (running for U.S. Senate)

Debates

Endorsements

Polling

Graphical summary

Aggregate polls

Runoff polling
Doug Collins vs. Brian Kemp

Marjorie Taylor Greene vs. Brian Kemp

Brian Kemp vs. David Perdue

Brian Kemp vs. Herschel Walker

Results

Democratic primary

Candidates

Nominee
Stacey Abrams, founder of Fair Fight Action, former Minority Leader of the Georgia House of Representatives (2011–2017) and nominee for governor in 2018

Declined
Kasim Reed, former Mayor of Atlanta (2010–2018) (ran for mayor)

Endorsements

Results

Independent and third-party candidates

Declared
Al Bartell (Independent), businessman, U.S. Air Force veteran, and perennial candidate

General election

Predictions

Debates

Endorsements

Polling
Aggregate polls

Graphical summary

Vernon Jones vs. Stacey Abrams

Doug Collins vs. Stacey Abrams

David Perdue vs. Stacey Abrams

Marjorie Taylor Greene vs. Stacey Abrams

Herschel Walker vs. Stacey Abrams

Results

See also
 Elections in Georgia
 Political party strength in Georgia
 Georgia Democratic Party
 Georgia Republican Party
 Government of Georgia (U.S. state)
2022 United States Senate election in Georgia
 2022 United States House of Representatives elections in Georgia
2022 Georgia House of Representatives election
 2022 Georgia State Senate election
 2022 Georgia state elections
2022 United States gubernatorial elections
 2022 United States elections

Notes

Partisan clients

References

External links 
Official campaign websites
 Stacey Abrams (D) for Governor
 Al Bartell (I) for Governor
 Shane T. Hazel (L) for Governor
 Brian Kemp (R) for Governor

2022
Georgia
Governor